Hopewell Presbyterian Church (Church at Camp Hopewell) is a historic Presbyterian church building in Oxford, Mississippi.

The church was built in 1849 and added to the National Register of Historic Places in 1999.

References

Presbyterian churches in Mississippi
Churches on the National Register of Historic Places in Mississippi
Georgian architecture in Mississippi
Churches completed in 1849
Buildings and structures in Oxford, Mississippi
1849 establishments in Mississippi
National Register of Historic Places in Lafayette County, Mississippi